John Bethell may refer to:

John Bethell (inventor) (c. 1804–1867), British solicitor and inventor
John Bethell, 1st Baron Bethell (1861–1945), British banker and politician
John P. Bethell (1907–1981), American politician
John Bethell, 2nd Baron Bethell (1902–1965), Baron Bethell

See also
John Bethel (born 1957), Canadian ice hockey player